Selaa, Silảh, is a village in the Tyre District in Southern Lebanon.

Name
According to E. H. Palmer, Silảh comes from "the crevasse".

History
In 1875,   Victor Guérin found here  250 Metuali inhabitants.  He further noted: "Here I found an ancient press, the lid of a sarcophagus with acroteria, and a broken sarcophagus, at one of whose ends is a projection resembling an altar. Near it is a great grave with room for two bodies, with a partition wall left in the rock; and beside this an enormous detached block, hollowed out for two bodies, and resting on a surface purposely planed.'
Close to Silah, Guérin also found the ruins of a small village, completely destroyed, known as Kh. Fenian.

In 1881, the PEF's Survey of Western Palestine (SWP) described it as: "a village, built of stone and of good materials, containing about 200  [..] Metawileh, on hill, with figs, olives, and arable land. Water from cisterns and a spring near." They further noted that it had a perennial spring, built up with masonry, and that it was "an ancient site; there is a terraced hill; there are six sarcophagi and two olive-presses near the village."

References

Bibliography

External links
 Selaa, Localiban
Survey of Western Palestine, Map 2:   IAA, Wikimedia commons

Populated places in Tyre District
Shia Muslim communities in Lebanon